The Braille pattern dots-156 is a 6-dot braille cell with the upper left, and middle and bottom right dots raised, or an 8-dot braille cell with the upper left, and upper-middle and lower-middle right dots raised. It is represented by the Unicode code point U+2831, and in Braille ASCII with a colon: ":".

Unified braille

In unified international braille, the braille pattern dots-156 is used to represent a guttural fricative or approximant, such as /h/, /ʜ/, or /ʕ/ when multiple letters correspond to these values, and is otherwise assigned as needed.

Table of unified braille values

Other braille

Plus dots 7 and 8

Related to Braille pattern dots-156 are Braille patterns 1567, 1568, and 15678, which are used in 8-dot braille systems, such as Gardner-Salinas and Luxembourgish Braille.

Related 8-dot kantenji patterns

In the Japanese kantenji braille, the standard 8-dot Braille patterns 268, 1268, 2468, and 12468 are the patterns related to Braille pattern dots-156, since the two additional dots of kantenji patterns 0156, 1567, and 01567 are placed above the base 6-dot cell, instead of below, as in standard 8-dot braille.

Kantenji using braille patterns 268, 1268, 2468, or 12468

This listing includes kantenji using braille pattern dots-156 for all 6349 kanji found in JIS C 6226-1978.

  - 都

Variants and thematic compounds

  -  selector 1 + さ/阝  =  卩
  -  selector 2 + さ/阝  =  卵
  -  selector 4 + さ/阝  =  印
  -  selector 5 + さ/阝  =  巷
  -  selector 6 + さ/阝  =  乍
  -  さ/阝 + selector 1  =  陸

Compounds of 都 and ⻏

  -  み/耳 + さ/阝  =  耶
  -  て/扌 + み/耳 + さ/阝  =  揶
  -  心 + み/耳 + さ/阝  =  椰
  -  へ/⺩ + さ/阝  =  邦
  -  め/目 + さ/阝  =  邪
  -  も/門 + さ/阝  =  邸
  -  ろ/十 + さ/阝  =  郁
  -  や/疒 + さ/阝  =  郎
  -  心 + や/疒 + さ/阝  =  榔
  -  へ/⺩ + や/疒 + さ/阝  =  瑯
  -  む/車 + や/疒 + さ/阝  =  螂
  -  お/頁 + さ/阝  =  郡
  -  ま/石 + さ/阝  =  部
  -  く/艹 + ま/石 + さ/阝  =  蔀
  -  さ/阝 + ち/竹  =  郊
  -  さ/阝 + こ/子  =  郭
  -  よ/广 + さ/阝 + こ/子  =  廓
  -  き/木 + さ/阝 + こ/子  =  槨
  -  さ/阝 + に/氵  =  郵
  -  ふ/女 + 宿 + さ/阝  =  娜
  -  て/扌 + 宿 + さ/阝  =  擲
  -  ね/示 + 龸 + さ/阝  =  祁
  -  な/亻 + 宿 + さ/阝  =  那
  -  さ/阝 + 比 + ふ/女  =  邨
  -  さ/阝 + selector 4 + る/忄  =  邯
  -  さ/阝 + く/艹 + selector 4  =  邱
  -  さ/阝 + ぬ/力 + 囗  =  邵
  -  さ/阝 + 氷/氵 + う/宀/#3  =  郛
  -  さ/阝 + れ/口 + へ/⺩  =  郢
  -  さ/阝 + た/⽥ + selector 1  =  郤
  -  さ/阝 + 宿 + け/犬  =  鄂
  -  さ/阝 + 宿 + も/門  =  鄒
  -  さ/阝 + 宿 + 囗  =  鄙
  -  さ/阝 + 宿 + て/扌  =  鄭
  -  さ/阝 + れ/口 + れ/口  =  鄲

Compounds of 卩

  -  よ/广 + さ/阝  =  厄
  -  て/扌 + よ/广 + さ/阝  =  扼
  -  む/車 + よ/广 + さ/阝  =  軛
  -  さ/阝 + よ/广 + さ/阝  =  阨
  -  さ/阝 + 囗  =  叩
  -  り/分 + さ/阝  =  命
  -  て/扌 + り/分 + さ/阝  =  掵
  -  く/艹 + さ/阝  =  危
  -  ⺼ + く/艹 + さ/阝  =  脆
  -  え/訁 + く/艹 + さ/阝  =  詭
  -  み/耳 + く/艹 + さ/阝  =  跪
  -  せ/食 + く/艹 + さ/阝  =  鮠
  -  す/発 + さ/阝  =  即
  -  ち/竹 + さ/阝  =  節
  -  れ/口 + す/発 + さ/阝  =  喞
  -  つ/土 + さ/阝  =  却
  -  ⺼ + さ/阝  =  脚
  -  ん/止 + さ/阝  =  卸
  -  ゆ/彳 + さ/阝  =  御
  -  ね/示 + ゆ/彳 + さ/阝  =  禦
  -  れ/口 + ん/止 + さ/阝  =  啣
  -  て/扌 + さ/阝  =  抑
  -  さ/阝 + 心  =  怨
  -  け/犬 + さ/阝  =  巻
  -  囗 + さ/阝  =  圏
  -  囗 + 囗 + さ/阝  =  圈
  -  け/犬 + け/犬 + さ/阝  =  卷
  -  な/亻 + け/犬 + さ/阝  =  倦
  -  る/忄 + け/犬 + さ/阝  =  惓
  -  て/扌 + け/犬 + さ/阝  =  捲
  -  い/糹/#2 + け/犬 + さ/阝  =  綣
  -  む/車 + け/犬 + さ/阝  =  蜷
  -  よ/广 + 宿 + さ/阝  =  卮
  -  さ/阝 + 宿 + た/⽥  =  卻
  -  さ/阝 + ほ/方 + selector 1  =  夘
  -  き/木 + ち/竹 + さ/阝  =  櫛
  -  に/氵 + 宿 + さ/阝  =  氾
  -  ち/竹 + 宿 + さ/阝  =  笵
  -  く/艹 + 宿 + さ/阝  =  范
  -  さ/阝 + 宿 + せ/食  =  鴛

Compounds of 卵

  -  さ/阝 + う/宀/#3  =  卯
  -  心 + さ/阝  =  柳
  -  日 + さ/阝 + う/宀/#3  =  昴
  -  心 + さ/阝 + う/宀/#3  =  茆
  -  な/亻 + さ/阝  =  仰
  -  ひ/辶 + さ/阝  =  迎
  -  う/宀/#3 + selector 2 + さ/阝  =  孵
  -  さ/阝 + 宿 + さ/阝  =  卿
  -  日 + 宿 + さ/阝  =  昂
  -  み/耳 + 宿 + さ/阝  =  聊
  -  か/金 + 宿 + さ/阝  =  鉚

Compounds of 巷

  -  に/氵 + さ/阝  =  港

Compounds of 乍

  -  仁/亻 + さ/阝  =  作
  -  ち/竹 + 仁/亻 + さ/阝  =  筰
  -  宿 + さ/阝  =  搾
  -  日 + さ/阝  =  昨
  -  え/訁 + さ/阝  =  詐
  -  せ/食 + さ/阝  =  酢
  -  る/忄 + selector 6 + さ/阝  =  怎
  -  れ/口 + 宿 + さ/阝  =  咋
  -  心 + 宿 + さ/阝  =  柞
  -  火 + 宿 + さ/阝  =  炸
  -  ね/示 + 宿 + さ/阝  =  祚
  -  う/宀/#3 + 宿 + さ/阝  =  窄
  -  ⺼ + 宿 + さ/阝  =  胙
  -  せ/食 + 宿 + さ/阝  =  鮓

Compounds of 陸 and ⻖

  -  さ/阝 + ふ/女  =  阜
  -  つ/土 + さ/阝 + ふ/女  =  埠
  -  そ/馬 + さ/阝  =  隊
  -  さ/阝 + さ/阝  =  際
  -  さ/阝 + よ/广  =  薩
  -  さ/阝 + ん/止  =  阪
  -  さ/阝 + ほ/方  =  防
  -  さ/阝 + そ/馬  =  阻
  -  さ/阝 + か/金  =  阿
  -  ふ/女 + さ/阝 + か/金  =  婀
  -  や/疒 + さ/阝 + か/金  =  痾
  -  さ/阝 + し/巿  =  附
  -  さ/阝 + い/糹/#2  =  降
  -  さ/阝 + や/疒  =  限
  -  さ/阝 + つ/土  =  陛
  -  さ/阝 + 宿  =  院
  -  さ/阝 + む/車  =  陣
  -  さ/阝 + も/門  =  除
  -  さ/阝 + ぬ/力  =  陥
  -  さ/阝 + さ/阝 + ぬ/力  =  陷
  -  さ/阝 + ま/石  =  陪
  -  さ/阝 + ゑ/訁  =  陰
  -  く/艹 + さ/阝 + ゑ/訁  =  蔭
  -  さ/阝 + ひ/辶  =  陳
  -  さ/阝 + す/発  =  陵
  -  さ/阝 + と/戸  =  陶
  -  さ/阝 + り/分  =  険
  -  さ/阝 + さ/阝 + り/分  =  險
  -  さ/阝 + 数  =  陽
  -  さ/阝 + く/艹  =  隅
  -  さ/阝 + せ/食  =  隆
  -  や/疒 + さ/阝 + せ/食  =  嶐
  -  う/宀/#3 + さ/阝 + せ/食  =  窿
  -  さ/阝 + た/⽥  =  隈
  -  さ/阝 + 日  =  階
  -  さ/阝 + ら/月  =  随
  -  さ/阝 + さ/阝 + ら/月  =  隨
  -  き/木 + さ/阝 + ら/月  =  橢
  -  さ/阝 + れ/口  =  隔
  -  さ/阝 + ⺼  =  隘
  -  さ/阝 + ろ/十  =  障
  -  さ/阝 + る/忄  =  隠
  -  さ/阝 + さ/阝 + る/忄  =  隱
  -  さ/阝 + の/禾  =  隣
  -  さ/阝 + さ/阝 + の/禾  =  鄰
  -  さ/阝 + 数 + せ/食  =  阡
  -  さ/阝 + selector 1 + 宿  =  阮
  -  さ/阝 + 宿 + ん/止  =  阯
  -  さ/阝 + 宿 + ひ/辶  =  陀
  -  さ/阝 + selector 4 + ひ/辶  =  陂
  -  さ/阝 + 数 + へ/⺩  =  陋
  -  さ/阝 + 数 + め/目  =  陌
  -  さ/阝 + ろ/十 + ら/月  =  陏
  -  さ/阝 + 宿 + な/亻  =  陜
  -  さ/阝 + 龸 + な/亻  =  陝
  -  さ/阝 + 日 + く/艹  =  陞
  -  さ/阝 + ん/止 + そ/馬  =  陟
  -  さ/阝 + へ/⺩ + し/巿  =  陦
  -  さ/阝 + み/耳 + ゑ/訁  =  陬
  -  さ/阝 + 宿 + に/氵  =  陲
  -  さ/阝 + 宿 + ら/月  =  隋
  -  さ/阝 + 日 + へ/⺩  =  隍
  -  さ/阝 + を/貝 + れ/口  =  隕
  -  さ/阝 + お/頁 + に/氵  =  隗
  -  さ/阝 + 比 + そ/馬  =  隙
  -  さ/阝 + selector 2 + そ/馬  =  隧
  -  さ/阝 + 宿 + い/糹/#2  =  隰
  -  さ/阝 + 宿 + そ/馬  =  隲
  -  さ/阝 + ま/石 + 心  =  隴

Other compounds

  -  た/⽥ + さ/阝  =  卑
  -  な/亻 + た/⽥ + さ/阝  =  俾
  -  ふ/女 + た/⽥ + さ/阝  =  婢
  -  や/疒 + た/⽥ + さ/阝  =  痺
  -  め/目 + た/⽥ + さ/阝  =  睥
  -  心 + た/⽥ + さ/阝  =  稗
  -  ね/示 + た/⽥ + さ/阝  =  裨
  -  か/金 + た/⽥ + さ/阝  =  髀
  -  れ/口 + さ/阝  =  叫
  -  ふ/女 + さ/阝  =  妻
  -  き/木 + さ/阝  =  棲
  -  さ/阝 + 氷/氵  =  凄
  -  る/忄 + ふ/女 + さ/阝  =  悽
  -  に/氵 + ふ/女 + さ/阝  =  淒
  -  く/艹 + ふ/女 + さ/阝  =  萋
  -  ね/示 + ふ/女 + さ/阝  =  褄
  -  ね/示 + さ/阝  =  祭
  -  う/宀/#3 + さ/阝  =  察
  -  く/艹 + ね/示 + さ/阝  =  蔡
  -  龸 + さ/阝  =  斎
  -  龸 + 龸 + さ/阝  =  齋
  -  を/貝 + 龸 + さ/阝  =  齎
  -  さ/阝 + 龸  =  斉
  -  さ/阝 + ね/示  =  剤
  -  さ/阝 + さ/阝 + ね/示  =  劑
  -  氷/氵 + さ/阝  =  済
  -  氷/氵 + 氷/氵 + さ/阝  =  濟
  -  さ/阝 + さ/阝 + 龸  =  齊
  -  な/亻 + さ/阝 + 龸  =  儕
  -  て/扌 + さ/阝 + 龸  =  擠
  -  心 + さ/阝 + 龸  =  薺
  -  み/耳 + さ/阝 + 龸  =  躋
  -  ち/竹 + さ/阝 + 龸  =  霽
  -  さ/阝 + さ/阝 + 龸  =  齊
  -  さ/阝 + 龸 + 火  =  韲
  -  い/糹/#2 + さ/阝 + 龸  =  緕
  -  火 + さ/阝  =  燦
  -  い/糹/#2 + さ/阝  =  糾
  -  は/辶 + さ/阝  =  遷
  -  と/戸 + は/辶 + さ/阝  =  韆
  -  仁/亻 + 宿 + さ/阝  =  僊
  -  の/禾 + 宿 + さ/阝  =  粲
  -  い/糹/#2 + 宿 + さ/阝  =  纃
  -  は/辶 + 宿 + さ/阝  =  赳
  -  さ/阝 + selector 4 + 火  =  齏

Notes

Braille patterns